The 1976 Penn State Nittany Lions football team represented the Pennsylvania State University in the 1976 NCAA Division I football season. The team was coached by Joe Paterno and played its home games in Beaver Stadium in University Park, Pennsylvania.

Schedule

Roster

NFL Draft
Four Nittany Lions were drafted in the 1977 NFL Draft.

References

Penn State
Penn State Nittany Lions football seasons
Penn State Nittany Lions football